Bert-Jan Lindeman (born 16 June 1989) is a Dutch professional road bicycle racer, who currently rides for UCI Continental team . His older brother Adrie is also a cyclist, who last rode for the Koga team in the Netherlands.

Career
Lindeman remained with  after his stint as a stagiaire, having signed a two-year deal from 2012. In March 2012, Lindeman achieved his first victory with the team, by winning the Ronde van Drenthe; after initiating a breakaway with Guillaume Boivin, Lindeman out-sprinted Boivin for the victory.

He then moved to the senior team,  for the 2015 season. Lindeman took his first win for the team in the 2015 Vuelta a España, winning stage 7 from the breakaway. He was named in the start list for the 2016 Tour de France.

Major results

2008
 1st Ronde van Groningen
 1st Prix des Flandres Françaises
 2nd PWZ Zuidenveld Tour
 8th Scandinavian Open Road Race
2009
 2nd Ronde van Midden-Brabant
 2nd Ronde van Limburg
 4th Dorpenomloop door Drenthe
 6th Tour de Seoul
2010
 1st Ster van Zwolle
 1st Stage 3 Tour de Gironde
 2nd Overall Festningsrittet
 3rd Ronde van Haarlemmerliede en Spaarnwoude
 4th Eschborn–Frankfurt Under–23
 10th Ronde van Noord-Holland
2011
 1st Hel van Voerendaal
 4th Ster van Zwolle
 4th Liège–Bastogne–Liège Espoirs
 10th Overall Tour de Gironde
2012
 1st Ronde van Drenthe
 1st  Mountains classification Étoile de Bessèges
 3rd Road race, National Road Championships
2014
 1st  Overall Tour de Bretagne
1st  Sprints classification
 1st  Overall Tour de l'Ain
1st Stage 3
 1st Ster van Zwolle
 2nd Dwars door Drenthe
 3rd Ronde van Drenthe
 4th Grand Prix de la ville de Pérenchies
 5th Omloop Het Nieuwsblad U23
 6th Tro-Bro Léon
 7th Overall Tour Alsace
2015
 1st Stage 7 Vuelta a España
 2nd Ronde van Drenthe
 Giro d'Italia
Held  after Stage 2
2017
 5th Brabantse Pijl
2020
 8th Dwars door het Hageland
2022
 2nd Overall Olympia's Tour
 10th Visit Friesland Elfsteden Race

Grand Tour general classification results timeline

References

External links

Vacansoleil-DCM profile

Cycling Quotient profile

1989 births
Living people
Dutch male cyclists
Dutch Vuelta a España stage winners
Sportspeople from Emmen, Netherlands
UCI Road World Championships cyclists for the Netherlands
21st-century Dutch people
Cyclists from Drenthe